In rugby union, the first meeting between Argentina and Wales took place in 1968, when they played two matches as part of a Welsh tour of Argentina; however, only Argentina awarded full caps for the two matches. Argentina won the first match 9–5 and the second was drawn 9–9. They met again in Cardiff in 1976, when Wales won 20–19. The first match for which both teams awarded full caps was in 1991, in the pool stage of the 1991 Rugby World Cup, when Wales won 16–7. Since then, the two teams have met a total of 21 times; Wales hold the upper hand with 14 wins to Argentina's 6, with 1 match drawn.

Summary
Note: Summary below reflects test results by both teams.

Overview

Records
Note: Date shown in brackets indicates when the record was or last set.

Matches

XV results
Below is a list of matches that Argentina has awarded test match status by virtue of awarding caps, but Wales did not award caps.

List of series

Notes

References

External links
RugbyData 

 
Argentina national rugby union team matches
Wales national rugby union team matches